Ghulam Shah Jeelani (7 August 1957 – 13 September 2019) was a Pakistani politician who was a member of the Provincial Assembly of Sindh from August 2018 until his death.

Biography
He was born on 7 August 1957 in Dadu to Pir Syed Allah Bux Shah Jilani and received a Master of Arts in International Politics from the University of Sindh. He was married and had two children.

He ran for the seat of the Provincial Assembly of Sindh as a candidate of Pakistan Peoples Party (PPP) from Constituency PS-75 (Dadu-V) in 2002 Pakistani general election, but was unsuccessful. He received 17,317 votes and lost the seat to a candidate of National Alliance.

He was elected to the Provincial Assembly of Sindh as a candidate of PPP from Constituency PS-75 Dadu-II in 2008 Pakistani general election. He received 35,910 votes and defeated a candidate of Pakistan Muslim League (Q).

He was re-elected to the Provincial Assembly of Sindh as a candidate of PPP from Constituency PS-75 Dadu-II in 2013 Pakistani general election. In July 2016, he was inducted into the provincial Sindh cabinet of Chief Minister Syed Murad Ali Shah and was appointed special assistant to the Chief Minister on the zakat and auqaf.

He was re-elected to Provincial Assembly of Sindh as a candidate of PPP from Constituency PS-86 (Dadu-IV) in 2018 Pakistani general election.

Ghulam Shah Jeelani died on 13 September 2019 in a private hospital in Karachi and was buried at the village of Naig Sharif located in Naig Valley.

References

1957 births
2019 deaths
Sindh MPAs 2013–2018
Pakistan People's Party MPAs (Sindh)
Sindh MPAs 2008–2013
Sindh MPAs 2018–2023